Neocuatrecasia is a genus of South American flowering plants in the tribe Eupatorieae within the family Asteraceae.

The genus is named in honor of Spanish botanist José Cuatrecasas (1903–1996).

 Species

References

Asteraceae genera
Eupatorieae
Flora of South America